BAF Shaheen English Medium College, or commonly known as BAF SEMC - is a school in Dhaka Cantonment, Dhaka, Bangladesh. Under the direct direction of the Bangladesh Air Force, its education is based on Cambridge International Examinations UK. Students at BAF SEMC began taking the O Level test administered by London University in 1998.

History
When BAF Shaheen English Medium College (SEMC) was first founded in 1992, it had 150 students, six classrooms from kindergarten to fourth grade, and seven teachers. By adding one class every year, SEMC has gradually increased the size of its program. As of October 2020, there are around 1600 students enrolled in grades I through XII as a whole. As the school began offering higher education in 2019, the name of the institution changed from BAF SEMS (Shaheen English Medium School) to BAF SEMC (Shaheen English Medium College) (A level). From June 2022 sessions on, SEMC began serving as an exam venue for the British Council for Cambridge school examinations.

References

Schools in Dhaka District
1992 establishments in Bangladesh
Bangladesh Air Force